The 1998 United States Road Racing Championship season was the inaugural season of the revived United States Road Racing Championship run by the Sports Car Club of America (SCCA).  The season involved four classes: Can-Am prototypes and three Grand Touring classes referred to at GT1, GT2, and GT3.  Five races were run from January 31, 1998, to August 23, 1998.

Schedule

Season results
Overall winners in bold.

References

External links
 The official website of Grand-Am
 World Sports Racing Prototypes - 1998 USRRC Results

United States Road Racing Championship
United States Road Racing Championship